BonIce is a brand of freezie owned by a subsidiary of Quala, a multinational Colombian company. It arrived to Mexico City in August 2004. It was quickly expanded in places like Guadalajara in June 2005, Villahermosa November 2005, Monterrey February 2006, Tijuana September 2006 and Brazil 2011/2012, with the name "Icegurt". Today it is available in over a hundred cities in all states across the country, and in other Central American countries. The product is sold direct to consumers on the streets by independent distributors, nicknamed "Hombre de Bonice" (Bonice Guy), coordinated under a franchise structure.

Flavors
Strawberry
Grape
Mango
Green Mango
Lime
Guanabana
Pineapple
Spicy Tamarind
Watermelon
Cherry
Green Apple
Blueberry
Kiwi
Chocolate
Mysterious flavor
aloe
Birria
Coffee
Cookie Dough
Blueberry Cheesecake

They also come with yogurt, or with two flavors combined called Bonice Doble (Double Bonice). The ads for Bonice Doble had 2 female twins and used a parody of the 2013 Robin Thicke single "Blurred Lines".

Mexicana
Mexicana (Mexican), or by its full name Mexicana con Orgullo (Mexican with Pride), is a carbonated soft drink produced by the Colombian company Quala and its Mexican subsidiary of Freezies Bonice. Its sale began at the end of March 2022.

See also
 List of frozen dessert brands

References

Brand name frozen desserts